Emmanuel Amoh Attipoe (born 22 June 2000) is a Ghanaian footballer who plays for Spanish club UD Logroñés, on loan from Albacete Balompié. Mainly a right back, he can also play as a right winger.

Career

Liberty Professionals 
A Liberty Professionals youth graduate, Attipoe made his first team debut on 28 March 2018, playing the last 20 minutes in a 2–0 away loss against International Allies. He played in all matches for the club during the campaign and made 3 assists before the league was halted.

Extremadura 
On 6 September 2018, he was loaned to Spanish club Extremadura UD and was initially assigned to the youth setup. Attipoe made his debut abroad on 23 February 2019, starting with the reserves in a 3–1 away win against CD Valdelacalzada. On 24 May, he signed a permanent contract with the club.

Attipoe made his first team debut for Extremadura on 8 June 2019, coming on as a second-half substitute for Kike Márquez in a 0–0 Segunda División home draw against RCD Mallorca. In the following two seasons, he was successfully converted into a right back, but left the club in January 2022 as their financial situation worsened.

Albacete 
On 10 January 2022, Attipoe signed a four-and-a-half-year contract with fellow Primera División RFEF side Albacete Balompié. He shared the starting spot with Diego Johannesson, contributing with 17 appearances (play-offs included) as his side returned to the second level at first attempt.

On 30 January 2023, after being rarely used, Attipoe moved on loan to UD Logroñés until the end of the 2022–23 Primera Federación.

References

External links

2000 births
Living people
Footballers from Accra
Ghanaian footballers
Association football defenders
Association football wingers
Ghana Premier League players
Liberty Professionals F.C. players
Segunda División players
Primera Federación players
Segunda División B players
Tercera División players
Extremadura UD B players
Extremadura UD footballers
Albacete Balompié players
UD Logroñés players
Ghanaian expatriate footballers
Ghanaian expatriate sportspeople in Spain
Expatriate footballers in Spain